Sangamon County is located in the center of the U.S. state of Illinois. According to the 2010 census, it had a population of 197,465. Its county seat and largest city is Springfield, the state capital.

Sangamon County is included in the Springfield, IL Metropolitan Statistical Area.

History

Sangamon County was formed in 1821 out of Madison and Bond counties. The county was named for the Sangamon River, which runs through it. The origin of the name of the river is unknown; among several explanations is the theory that it comes from the Pottawatomie word Sain-guee-mon (pronounced "sang gä mun"), meaning "where there is plenty to eat."  Published histories of neighboring Menard County (formed from Sangamon County) suggest that the name was first given to the river by the French explorers of the late 17th century as they passed through the region. The river was named to honor "St. Gamo", or Saint Gamo, an 8th-century French Benedictine monk. The French pronunciation "San-Gamo" is the legacy.

Prior to being elected President of the United States, Abraham Lincoln represented Sangamon County in the Illinois Legislature. Lincoln, along with several other legislators, was instrumental in securing Springfield, the Sangamon County seat, as the state's capital. Sangamon County was also within the congressional district represented by Lincoln when he served in the US House of Representatives. Another legislator who represented Sangamon County was Colonel Edmund Dick Taylor, also known as "Father of the Greenback". The prominent financiers and industrialists Jacob Bunn and John Whitfield Bunn were based in Springfield, Sangamon County, Illinois, as well as in Chicago, during the nineteenth century and the early twentieth century. The careers of these men and the people with whom they collaborated helped to shape much of the history and development of Sangamon County, Illinois.

Geography

Climate and weather

Major highways
  Interstate 55
  Interstate 55 Business Loop
  Interstate 72
  U.S. Route 36
  Illinois Route 4
  Illinois Route 29
  Illinois Route 54
  Illinois Route 97
  Illinois Route 104
  Illinois Route 124
  Illinois Route 123
  Illinois Route 125

Transit
 Sangamon Mass Transit District
 Springfield station
 List of intercity bus stops in Illinois

Adjacent counties

 Menard County - north
 Logan County - northeast
 Macon County - east
 Christian County - southeast
 Montgomery County - south
 Macoupin County - south
 Morgan County - west
 Cass County - northwest

National protected areas
 Lincoln Home National Historic Site

State protected areas
  Sangchris Lake State Recreation Area

Demographics

As of the 2010 census, there were 197,465 people, 82,986 households, and 51,376 families residing in the county. The racial makeup of the county was 83.6% white, 11.8% black or African American, 1.6% Asian, 0.2% American Indian, 0.5% from other races, and 2.2% from two or more races. Those of Hispanic or Latino origin made up 1.8% of the population. In terms of ancestry, 29.4% were German, 14.8% were Irish, 12.1% were English, 9.5% were American, and 6.3% were Italian.

Of the 82,986 households, 30.4% had children under the age of 18 living with them, 44.4% were married couples living together, 13.2% had a female householder with no husband present, 38.1% were non-families, and 31.8% of all households were made up of individuals. The average household size was 2.33 and the average family size was 2.94. The median age was 39.2 years.

The median income for a household in the county was $52,232 and the median income for a family was $66,917. Males had a median income of $48,324 versus $36,691 for females. The per capita income for the county was $28,394. About 9.9% of families and 13.4% of the population were below the poverty line, including 19.7% of those under age 18 and 7.3% of those age 65 or over.

Government
Sangamon County is governed by a 29-member board. Each member of the board is elected from a separate district.

Other elected officials include:

Politics
Like much of Central Illinois, Sangamon County tilts Republican. It is rather conservative for a county with an urban state capital, but is not nearly as conservative as the surrounding counties. Only six Democrats have carried it since 1896. It is slowly moving towards the Democratic camp, having shifted 8.7 points to the left since 2000 (as of 2020).

Communities

Cities 

 Auburn
 Leland Grove
 Springfield (county seat and largest municipality)
 Virden

Villages

 Berlin
 Buffalo
 Cantrall
 Chatham
 Clear Lake
 Curran
 Dawson
 Divernon
 Grandview
 Illiopolis
 Jerome
 Loami
 Mechanicsburg
 New Berlin
 Pawnee
 Pleasant Plains
 Riverton
 Rochester
 Sherman
 Southern View
 Spaulding
 Thayer
 Williamsville

Unincorporated communities

 Andrew
 Archer
 Barclay
 Barr
 Bates
 Berry
 Bissell
 Bradfordton
 Breckenridge
 Buckhart
 Buffalo Hart
 Cimic
 Clayville
 Farmingdale
 Glenarm
 Island Grove
 Lowder
 New City
 Riddle Hill
 Salisbury
 Toronto
 Zenobia

Townships
Sangamon County is divided into these townships:

 Auburn
 Ball
 Buffalo Hart
 Capital
 Cartwright
 Chatham
 Clear Lake
 Cooper
 Cotton Hill
 Curran
 Divernon
 Fancy Creek
 Gardner
 Illiopolis
 Island Grove
 Lanesville
 Loami
 Maxwell
 Mechanicsburg
 New Berlin
 Pawnee
 Rochester
 Salisbury (former, now defunct)
 Springfield
 Talkington
 Williams
 Woodside

Education
Here is a listing of school districts (all are full K-12) with any territory in this county, no matter how small, even if the administrative headquarters and/or schools are in other counties:

 A-C Central Community Unit School District 262
 Community Unit School District 16
 Athens Community Unit School District 213
 Auburn Community Unit School District 10
 Ball-Chatham Community Unit School District 5
 Edinburg Community Unit School District 4
 Mount Pulaski Community Unit District 23
 North Mac Community Unit School District 34
 Pawnee Community Unit School District 11
 Porta Community Unit School District 202
 Pleasant Plains Community Unit School District 8
 Riverton Community Unit School District 14
 Rochester Community Unit School District 3A
 Sangamon Valley Community Unit School District 9
 Springfield School District 186
 Tri-City Community Unit School District 1
 Waverly Community Unit School District 6
 Williamsville Community Unit School District 15

Forts
 Camp Butler

See also

 National Register of Historic Places listings in Sangamon County, Illinois

References

External links

 County of Sangamon

 
Illinois counties
Illinois placenames of Native American origin
1821 establishments in Illinois
Populated places established in 1821
Springfield metropolitan area, Illinois